Xavier O'Halloran (born 11 July 2000) is an Australian rules footballer who plays for the Greater Western Sydney Giants in the Australian Football League (AFL). He was recruited by the Greater Western Sydney Giants with the 22nd draft pick in the 2018 AFL draft.

Early football
O'Halloran played school football for his team at St. Bernard's College in Melbourne, where he won the Herald Sun Shield and the Neale Daniher Award. He also captained the Western Jets in the NAB League for the 2018 season, while playing for them in the 2017 and 2018 seasons, where he picked up a total of 31 goals. O'Halloran also represented and captained Vic Metro in the AFL Under 18 Championships for the 2018 season.

AFL career
O'Halloran debuted in the Giants' four point win against the Essendon Bombers in the tenth round of the 2020 AFL season. O'Halloran picked up 9 disposals, 3 tackles and a clearance.

Statistics
 Statistics are correct to the end of Round 22 2022

|- style="background-color: #eaeaea"
! scope="row" style="text-align:center" | 2019
|  || 33 || 0 || — || — || — || — || — || — || — || — || — || — || — || — || — || —
|- 
! scope="row" style="text-align:center" | 2020
|style="text-align:center;"|
| 33 || 2 || 0 || 0 || 9 || 10 || 19 || 2 || 6 || 0.0 || 0.0 || 4.5 || 5.0 || 9.5 || 1.0 || 3.0
|- style="background:#EAEAEA; font-weight:bold; width:2em"
|- style="background-color: #eaeaea"
! scope="row" style="text-align:center" | 2021
|  || 33 || 17 || 5 || 3 || 124 || 56 || 180 || 42 || 22 || 0.2 || 0.1 || 7.2 || 3.2 || 10.5 || 2.4 || 1.2
|- style="background-color: #eaeaea"
! scope="row" style="text-align:center" | 2022
|  || 33 || 14 || 1 || 3 || 88 || 55 || 143 || 35 || 24 || 0.0 || 0.2 || 6.2 || 3.9 || 10.2 || 2.5 || 1.7
|- style="background-color: #EAEAEA"
| scope="row" text-align:center class="sortbottom" colspan=3 | Career
| 33
| 6
| 6
| 221
| 121
| 342
| 79
| 52
| 0.1
| 0.1
| 6.6
| 3.6
| 10.3
| 2.3
| 1.5
|}

References

External links

2000 births
Living people
Greater Western Sydney Giants players
Australian rules footballers from Melbourne
Western Jets players
People educated at St. Bernard's College, Melbourne
People from Essendon, Victoria